Kangal is a town and a district of Sivas Province in Turkey.

Kangal may also refer to:
 Kangal Shepherd Dog
 Kangal (film), a 1953 Tamil language film
 Kangal power station, Turkey
 Kangal Harinath (1833-1896), Bengali journalist, poet and Baul singer

See also
 Kangal-Deliktaş Tunnel, Turkey
 Kangalli Station, a railway station in North Korea
 New Kangal station, a railway station in Turkey